Teuthrone was a town of ancient Laconia, situated upon the western side of the Laconian Gulf, 150 stadia from Cape Taenarum. 

According to the ancient inhabitants it was founded by the Athenian Teuthras (Τεύθρας). The chief deity worshiped here was Artemis Issoria. It had a fountain called Naia (Ναΐα).

Augustus made Teuthrone one of the Eleuthero-Laconian towns. Its ruins exist at the modern village of Kotronas, and its citadel occupied a small peninsula, called Skopos, Skopia or Skopópolis.

References

Bibliography
 

Populated places in ancient Laconia
Former populated places in Greece
Ancient Greek archaeological sites in Greece